The International Orange Chorale of San Francisco (IOCSF) is an auditioned all-volunteer chamber choir devoted to performing established repertoire of all periods, with particular attention to 20th-century music—including newly commissioned works of promising composers. Since its inception, the group has been committed to performing free concerts featuring challenging and imaginative choral a cappella programming.

The ensemble is based in San Francisco.

Origins and management
The group was founded in 2003 by Jeremy Faust, Elaine Robertson and Cole Thomason-Redus

and continued under the direction of Jeremy Faust. Several IOCSF members have conducted selected pieces. In 2007, after having conducted several pieces each season as a member of the group in 2006 and 2005, Paul Kim joined Jeremy Faust as co-director.

During the 2007-2008 season, choir member Zane Fiala also conducted several pieces;

Fiala became co-director as of the 2008/2009 season,

joining Faust upon Kim's departure from the San Francisco Bay Area.

Fiala now directs and conducts the group, while Faust maintains a role as Director of Artistic Outreach.

The ensemble is named after International orange, the official color of the Golden Gate Bridge

Publishing, premieres and other programming
In 2011, IOCSF launched a new choral music publishing series partnership with Santa Barbara Music Publishing, with the release of "Peace," by Aaron Pike. Additionally, several of the compositions listed below have been published by Santa Barbara Music Publishing, G. Schirmer, and Hal Leonard after IOCSF premiered the works.

World premieres/commissions 
 Cole Thomason-Redus: Nigra Sum (2004)
 Jeremy Faust: Concord Hymn (2004)
 Georgia Stitt: De Profundis (2004)
 Sarah George: Cors de Chasses (2005)
 Elizabeth Baker: One, Two, Three (2006)
 Jason Bush: Alma Redemptoris Mater (2007)
 Jeremy Faust: Croyez-vous (2007)
 Jason Bush: A Beautiful Day (2008)
 Jason Bush: Leaves are Falling (2008)
 Jeremy Faust: Atah Echad (2008)
 Georgia Stitt: Joyful Noise (2009)
 Eric Tamm: Kyrie (2009)
 Zane Fiala: Es la Mañana Llena (2009)
 Schaffer McGee, The Bird of Night; Death of a Ball Turret Gunner (2009); The Breath of Night (2010)
 Robert Chastain: Ave Verum Corpus (2010)
 Nicholas Boland: Gentle Lady, Do Not Sing (2010)
 Jed Bogan: The Moment (2010)
 Harry Whitney: In Memoriam [aka, "Sweet Poplar"] (2010)
 Aaron Pike: Peace (2010)
 Joshua Saulle: i am a little church (2010)
 David Harris: Presence (2010)
 Mari Esabel Valverde: Månskenskväll ["Moonlit Evening"] (2011)
 Aaron Pike: Alleluia (2011)
 Nicholas Weininger: Deeper Than All Roses (2011)
 Jeremy Faust: Issa (selected movements) (2011)
 Zane Fiala: Cosmos (2012)
 Dominick DiOrio: Chrysopylae (2012)
 David Conte: Facing West (2012)
 Vasken Ohanian: Ave (2012)
 David Gottlieb: Come, Heavy Sleep (2012)
 Mari Esabel Valverde: Oracle of Spring (2012)
 Elliott James Encarnacion: We Sat Down and Wept (2012)
 Caroline Shaw: Fly Away I (2012)
 Daniel Kohane: Sonnet (2012)

American/regional premieres
 Thomas Ades (UK): Fayrfax Carol (USA West Coast premiere)
 Algirdas Martinaitis (Estonia): Alleluia (Western Hemisphere Premiere)
 Jake Heggie (America): Faith Disquiet (California Premiere of revision)
 Milton Babbitt (America): Music for the Mass (Western USA Premiere—Second performance ever, first ever a cappella as composer intended) (2010)
 Fredrik Sixten: There is no Rose of such Vertu (2012)
 Uģis Prauliņš: Credo from Missa Rigensis (2012)
 Sarah Kirkland Snider: Unremembered (first five movements, USA West Coast premiere) (2013): The Guest, The River, The Girl, The Song, The Orchard

Other repertory highlights
 Frank Martin: Mass for Two Choirs
 Herbert Howells: Requiem
 Claude Debussy: Trois Chansons D'Orleans
 Paul Hindemith: Six Chansons de Rilke
 Ralph Vaughan Williams: Three Shakespeare Songs
 Matthew Harris: Shakespeare Songs
 Gustav Holst: Tomorrow Shall Be My Dancing Day
 Gustav Holst: O Spiritual Pilgrim
 Benjamin Britten: Ad Majorem Dei Gloriam
 Otto Olsson: Ave Maris Stella
 Alberto Grau: Kasar mie la gaji
 Johannes Brahms: Op. 74, Nos. 1, 2 "Warum ist das Licht gegeben?"; "O Heiland reiß"
 Johannes Brahms: Op. 109, No. 2. "Wenn ein starker Gewappneter"
 Johannes Brahms: Liebeslieder Waltzes
 Johann Sebastian Bach: "Ich lasse dicht nicht, du segnest mich denn"
 Hugo Distler: Singet dem Herrn ein neues lied
 William Henry Harris: Faire is the Heaven
 Samuel Barber: The Reincarnations
 Samuel Barber: Heaven Haven
 Samuel Barber: To be sung on the Water
 Olivier Messiaen: O Sacrum Convivium
 Francis Poulenc: Four Motes for Noel
 Maurice Durufle: Four Gregorian Motets
 Sven-David Sandström: A New Heaven ("En Ny Himmel")
 Jānis Peters: Kalējs kala debesīs
 David Conte: Ave Maria
 Steven Paulus: The Road Home
 Emma Lou Diemer: Verses from the Rubaiyat
 Robin Estrada: Awit sa Panginoon
 Halsey Stevens: Go Lovely Rose
 Joseph Gregorio: Dona Nobis Pacem

Other collaborations/assistance
 On June 11, 2011, IOCSF and Volti performed the closing concert at the Chorus America conference.
 On June 10, 2011, IOCSF collaborated with Ragnar Bohlin on two sessions at the Chorus America conference. IOCSF served as the choir for the Conducting Masterclass taught by Bohlin. IOCSF also served as the choir for the session demonstrating new Scandinavian repertoire.
 On January 24, 2010, IOCSF joined the San Francisco Boys Chorus, mezzo-soprano Frederica von Stade, mezzo-soprano Zheng Cao, the San Francisco Opera Chorus and other performers in a relief concert for victims of the recent earthquake in Haiti.

 In January 2009, IOCSF joined the Yale Glee Club in performing at Grace Cathedral in San Francisco.

 July 28, 2008, marked IOCSF's first instrumental collaboration (if you exclude the egg shaker during the South American program). The ensemble performed as part of the Noontime Concert Series at Old St. Mary's with San Francisco piano duo Patricia and Vera Purcell. Program selections included Brahms Liebeslider Waltzes, as well as New York: Night (by Jeremy Faust and opera librettist Philip Littell).
 IOC has received guest coaching from the following experts:
 Vance George: former choral director of the Grammy-winning San Francisco Symphony Chorus
 Magen Solomon: Artistic Director of San Francisco Choral Artists
 Joe Jennings: then Artistic Director of Chanticleer
 Ian Robertson: Director of the San Francisco Opera Chorus and also of the San Francisco Boys Chorus
 Patricia Kristof Moy: French coach for the San Francisco Opera
 Jimmy Kansau: San Francisco Opera
 Ragnar Bohlin: Chorus Director, San Francisco Symphony Chorus
 Joshua Habermann: Director, Dallas Symphony Chorus; Music Director, Santa Fe Desert Chorale

Awards, reviews
 ASCAP "Adventurous Programming" Award 2011, received at Chorus America conference
 San Francisco Classical Voice review of June 17, 2011 concert 
 San Francisco Classical Voice review of May 1, 2009 concert

References

External links
 Official website

Choirs in the San Francisco Bay Area
Musical groups from San Francisco
Organizations based in San Francisco
Non-profit organizations based in California
Musical groups established in 2003
2003 establishments in California